Rex Haddon Downing (April 21, 1925 – November 18, 2020) was an American actor as a child and youth.

Early years
Downing attended Hollywood High School.

Career 
Rex Downing started his film career in several Our Gang comedies, but his roles there and in feature films were usually small.  He received first attention when he played Young Heathcliff in the 1939 William Wyler film Wuthering Heights (1939), which was nominated for eight Academy Awards. In the following time Downing had a major role in the B-Movie serial Mandrake the Magician (1939; serial) and played the younger version of Tyrone Power's character in Blood and Sand (1941).

After his service in World War II, he returned to film business in 1946, but only got small parts. He left film business in 1948 and later became a teacher around Los Angeles.

Personal life 
His younger brother Barry Downing (1931–1995) was also a child actor.

Downing died in November 2020 at the age of 95.

Filmography

References

1925 births
2020 deaths
Male actors from San Francisco
American male child actors
20th-century American male actors
American male film actors
United States Navy personnel of World War II
Educators from California
Military personnel from California